Gaziz (Ğäziz) is a rural locality (a village) in Ibrayevsky Selsoviet, Kugarchinsky District, Bashkortostan, Russia. The population was 74 as of 2010. There is 1 street.

Geography 
Gaziz is located 16 km northwest of Mrakovo (the district's administrative centre) by road. Igubayevo is the nearest rural locality.

References 

Rural localities in Kugarchinsky District